Stephen Richard Turnbull (born 6 February 1948) is a British historian concentrating on Japanese military history, especially the samurai period, and has published numerous books. He provides information and advice to media organizations about Japan.

Biography
Turnbull attended Cambridge University where he gained his first degree. He currently holds 2 MAs in Theology and Military History and a PhD from the University of Leeds where he is a lecturer in Far Eastern Religions.

He was on the editorial board of the short-lived Medieval History Magazine (2003–2005), which was published in association with the Royal Armouries. He was a consultant for the widely successful PC game Shogun: Total War and also its well-received sequel Total War: Shogun 2, both products of Creative Assembly, as well as historical advisor on the Hollywood film 47 Ronin starring Keanu Reeves. He was also a narrator for the Netflix documentary series Age of Samurai: Battle for Japan in 2021.

He became semi-retired, but holds the post of Visiting Professor of Japanese Studies at Akita International University in Japan.

Selected works 
 1979 – Samurai armies, 1550–1615. London: Osprey Publishing. ; OCLC 6489751
 reprinted by Osprey, 2003: OCLC 225518299
 1980 – The Mongols. Oxford: Osprey Publishing. 
 1982 – The Book of the Samurai. Leicester, England: Magna Books. ; OCLC 15875673
 1985 – The Book of the Medieval Knight. London: Arms and Armour Press. ; OCLC 12501653.
 1987 – Samurai Warriors. Poole, Dorset: Blandford Press. ; OCLC 17551861
 1989 – Samurai Warlords: The Book of the Daimyō. London: Blandford. ; OCLC 22628902
 1991 – Ninja: The True Story of Japan's Secret Warrior Cult. Poole, Dorset: Firebird Books. ; OCLC 24701255
 1996 – The Samurai: A Military History. London: Routledge. 
 1997 – Samurai Warfare. London: Arms and Armour Press. ; OCLC 38030598
 1998 – The Samurai Sourcebook. London: Arms & Armour Press. ; OCLC 60220867
 reprinted by Cassell, London, 2000. ; OCLC 59400034
 2000 – Nagashino 1575: Slaughter at the Barricades. Oxford: Osprey Publishing. 
 2001 – Ashigaru 1467–1649: Weapons, Armour, Tactics. Oxford: Osprey Publishing. 
 2001 – The Knight Triumphant: The High Middle Ages, 1314–1485. London: Cassell. ; OCLC 51108644
 2002 – Samurai Heraldry. Oxford: Osprey Publishing. 
 2002 – Samurai Invasion: Japan's Korean War, 1592–1598. London: Cassell. 
 2002 – War in Japan: 1467–1615. Oxford: Osprey Publishing. 
 2003 – Genghis Khan & the Mongol Conquests 1190–1400. Oxford: Osprey Publishing. 
 2002 – Fighting Ships of the Far East (1): China and Southeast Asia, 202 BC-AD 1419. Oxford: Osprey Publishing. 
 2003 – Fighting Ships of the Far East (2): Japan and Korea AD 612-1639. Oxford: Osprey Publishing. 
 2003 – Japanese castles, 1540–1640. Oxford: Osprey Publishing. 
 2003 – Japanese Warrior Monks AD 949–1603. Oxford: Osprey Publishing. 
 2003 – Kawanakajima 1553–1564: Samurai Power Struggle. Oxford: Osprey Publishing. 
 2003 – Ninja AD 1460–1650. Oxford: Osprey Publishing. 
 2003 – Tannenberg 1410: Disaster for the Teutonic Knights. Oxford: Osprey Publishing. ; OCLC 51779463
 2003 – Samurai: The World of the Warrior. Oxford: Osprey Publishing. 
 2004 – The Walls of Constantinople: AD 324–1453. Oxford:Osprey Publishing. 
 2004 – Samurai: The Story of Japan's Greatest Warriors. London: PRC Publishing Ltd. 
 reprinted by Metro Books, 2013
 2005 – Warriors of Medieval Japan. Oxford: Osprey Publishing. 
 2005 – Samurai Commanders. Oxford: Osprey Publishing. 
 2007 – The Great Wall of China 221 BC - AD 1644 Oxford: Osprey Publishing. 
 2008 – The Samurai Swordsman: Master of War. London: Frontline Books. ; 
 2010 – Katana: The Samurai Sword. Oxford: Osprey Publishibg 
 2011 – The Revenge of the 47 Ronin. Oxford: Osprey Publishing. 
 2016 – The Genpei War 1180-85: The Great Samurai Civil War. Oxford: Osprey Publishing. 
 2017 – Ninja: Unmasking the Myth Casemate Publishers.

Journal articles
 "Legacy of Centuries: The Walls of Constantinople", Medieval History Magazine (MHM), Issue 2, October 2003.
 "Mongol strategy and the Battle of Leignitz 1241", MHM, Issue 3, November 2003.
 "The Teutonic Knights' battle for Riga", MHM, Issue 6, February 2004.
 "The Passing of the Medieval Castle", MHM, Issue 9, May 2004.
 "St Catherine's Monastery: Sanctuary of Ages", MHM, Issue 11 July 2004.
 "Fighting Cardinals: Henry Beaufort & Guiliano Cesarini", MHM, Issue 13, September 2004.
 "A Tale of Two Cities: Siege success and failure at Constantinople and Belgrade", MHM, Issue 16, December 2004.
 "The Blunted Arrowhead: The defensive role of the great medieval fortresses of Albania", MHM, Issue 17, January 2005.
 "The Ninja: An Invented Tradition?", Journal of Global Initiatives: Policy, Pedagogy, Perspective, Vol. 9: No. 1, Article 3, 2014.

Filmography
These are notable works in film, TV and video games.

Honors
 British Association for Japanese Studies, Cannon Prize.
 Japan Festival Literary Award (1998).

Notes

External links
Stephen Turnbull's website

Academics of the University of Leeds
British medievalists
British Japanologists
Living people
1948 births
Alumni of the University of Cambridge